Alcyoniina is a suborder of soft coral found mainly in the Pacific and Indian oceans.

Families
Alcyoniidae
Nidaliidae

References

Octocorallia
Fauna of the Indian Ocean
Fauna of the Pacific Ocean